"Gonna Get Along Without Ya Now" is a popular song written by Milton Kellem and published in 1951.  Originally written in English, it has been done in several styles and tempos.

The first known recorded version was released in 1951, by Roy Hogsed. The "original" version, recorded by Teresa Brewer with Orchestra directed by Ray Bloch on January 10, 1952, was released by Coral Records as catalog number 60676 on April 5, 1952. It reached number 25 on the Billboard charts.  It was done in a "Swing" style, with big band backing (including mouth harp).

Patience and Prudence had more success with the song when they recorded it in 1956, reaching number 11 on the chart. This is considered the benchmark version, by which all others are judged, due to the intimate harmony of the two young singers.  This version brightened the melody somewhat, and later artists followed the brighter version, as did Brewer when she recorded an album version in 1964 in a semi-Caribbean style.

Two other versions hit the US chart in 1964 as sung by Tracey Dey (peaking at number 51) and Skeeter Davis (peaking at number 48).

Dey's version was done in a style emulating the Wall of Sound, which was popular with girl groups at the time.

Davis' version reached the Top 10 on Country charts and is considered by oldies enthusiasts to be "the" cover version.  Where the Patience and Prudence version has an orchestral backing, the Davis version has a pop band backing of electronic organ, bass and drums, with violin and backup singers.

Cover versions
In addition to the hit versions of the 1960s, the song has been recorded by:
The Bell Sisters in 1956, using the alternate title "Boom Boom, My Honey" on the Bermuda Records label, with a simple, slightly Calypso arrangement and Jamaican accents.
Chet Atkins on his 1968 LP Solo Flights
Skeeter Davis, in 1964 and again in 1971
Tracey Dey, in 1964
The Vibrations (1966), who did a funk-style version
Trini Lopez (U.S. #93, 1967)
Brent Dowe and The Melodians (1967), who recorded the rocksteady version produced by Duke Reid.
Penny Marshall and Cindy Williams, who recorded a version on their 1976 novelty LP, Laverne & Shirley Sing.
Viola Wills (1979), doing a version in "Disco" or "Hi-NRG" style, with a slower tempo and heavy electronic instrumental backing.  The Viola Wills version of the song peaked at number 52 on the U.S. disco chart, number 8 on the UK Singles Chart, number 37 in Australia and number 3 in New Zealand.
Tina Charles on The Original British Pop Princess - Tina Charles - Greatest Hits. 
Kati Kovács in 1981, Mindig van valami baj veled.
Bad Manners (1989), a ska version
The Lemonheads (1991)
Maureen McGovern on her 1992 album Baby I'm Yours
Mr President (1995), done in a Eurodance style.
Michelle, then known as Tanja Thomas (2006), dance style and tempo, on her album My Passion.
Cristina del Valle, in Catalan, again in a dance style and tempo
Soraya Arnelas (2007), in both English and Spanish (not mixing the languages), dance style
She & Him, with vocals by Zooey Deschanel, covering Skeeter Davis's version of the song on their 2010 album Volume Two
UB40, on their Labour of Love IV album (2010) and as a single released on 25 January 2010
Lucecita Benitez (1964) Spanish Version "No Seas Tan Bobo"

References

Trini Lopez songs
The Lemonheads songs
Teresa Brewer songs
She & Him songs
Skeeter Davis songs
Viola Wills songs
1951 songs
1952 singles
1956 singles
1964 singles
1967 singles
1980 singles